LUN or Lun may refer to:

 Logical unit number, in computer storage
 Lun, Croatia
 Lown-e Kohneh or Lūn, Iran
 Lün, a district in Mongolia's Central Province
 ISO 639-3 language code for the Lunda language
 Lun-class ekranoplan, a Soviet ground-effect vehicle